Chakwal is a city in Punjab, Pakistan.

Chakwal may also refer to:
Chakwal District, a district situated in Pakistan.
Chakwal Tehsil, an administrative unit of Chakwal district.
Chakwal railway station, a railway station in Pakistan,

See also
Chakwal-Khushab Road, a road track linking the Khushab with Chakwal.